Eukaryotic translation initiation factor 3 subunit B (eIF3b) is a protein that in humans is encoded by the EIF3B gene.

Interactions 

EIF3B has been shown to interact with P70-S6 Kinase 1 and EIF3A.

See also 
Eukaryotic initiation factor 3 (eIF3)

References

Further reading